Jean Robin (born 1946) is a French writer, essayist, and conspiracy theorist particularly interested in occult and esoteric issues, secret societies, and their influence throughout history.

Biography  

It was at the beginning of his career at Éditions Robert Laffont that Jean Robin discovered René Guénon's writings.

He subsequently produced the text (René Guénon témoin de la Tradition, 1978), and has continued to make reference to the latter's work in other essays (Le Royaume du Graal, 1992; Veilleur, où en est la nuit (2000); H.P. Lovecraft et le secret des adorateurs du Serpent 2017).

The theme central to his work is eschatology, which refers to the events that are thought to accompany the "end of our world" or historical-cosmological cycle. It is from the point of view of eschatology and with a Guenonian approach that he writes about themes such as "so-called aliens", anti-initiation manipulation, Rennes-le-Château, occultism in Nazism, and the history of France and its mysteries.

Adolf Hitler & Antarctica
Jean Robin's book Opération Orth ou l'Incroyable secret de Rennes-le-Château was published in 1989, which involved flying saucers and The Black Order. According to Jean Robin's anonymous informant in this book, Adolf Hitler died in a subterranean complex beneath Antarctica in 1953, where his body is preserved in a hexagonal casket (opposite to that of Raoul Wallenberg). The Black Order believes in Holocaust denial.

Publications

Works 
 René Guénon, témoin de la tradition, Paris, ed. Guy Trédaniel, 1978,  (reissued. Robert Laffont, 1978), 355 p.
 Les Objets volants non identifiés ou la Grande parodie, Paris, Éditions de la Maisnie, 1979, 140 p., translated into Spanish under the title UFO, la gran parodia.
 Réponse de Nostradamus à Monsieur de Fontbrune, Paris, Éditions de la Maisnie, 1981, 133 p., translated into Spanish under the title Respuesto de Nostradamus a Monsieur de Fontbrune, Esoteria (1982), .
 Rennes-le-Château. La colline envoûtée, Paris, Éditions de la Maisnie, 1982, 
 René Guénon. La dernière chance de l'Occident, Paris, Éditions de la Maisnie, 1983, 206 p, 
 Les Sociétés secrètes au rendez-vous de l'Apocalypse, Paris, Guy Trédaniel and Éd. de la Maisnie, 1985, 390 p.,  translated into Spanish under the title Las sociedades secretas en la cita del Apocalipsis .
 Thèbes, Temples et Dieux du Nil, Éditions Robert Laffont, 1986, 138 p., 
 La véritable mission du Comte de Saint-Germain, Guy Trédaniel, 1986, 125 p., 
 Seth, le dieu maudit, éditions Guy Trédaniel, 1986, 249 p., 
 Hitler, l'élu du dragon, Paris, Éditions de la Maisnie, 1987, 239 p., . translated into Spanish under the title Hitler, el elegido del dragón, Colección Enigmas de la historia, Roca, 1991, reissue November 2015 with a preface and an interview with the author, 314 p, Camion Noir publisher, .
 Opération Orth ou l'Incroyable secret de Rennes-le-Château, Paris, Guy Trédaniel, 1989, 269 p., 
 
 
 
 .

Magazines 
Jean Robin has contributed to several magazines:
In it is also published an article by René Guénon published in Italian (translated by Evola or perhaps having rewritten (or synthesized) a passage from the Chaos social chapt. 6 of La Crise moderne). Translation .
 Collective work Les Cahiers de l'Herne, N°49 (1985), devoted to René Guénon: author of the article entitled Le problème du mal dans l'œuvre de René Guénon, (pp. 102–112).
 Revue L'Âge d'or, winter 1987, interview with Jean Robin about his book "Seth le dieu maudit".

References

External links 
 Interview of Jean Robin about his latest work H.P. Lovecraft et le secret des adorateurs du serpent 
 Jean Robin on Gazette de Rennes-le-Château
 Jean Robin on Babelio + video (14 July 2017)
 Jean Robin at Guy Trédaniel publisher

1946 births
20th-century French essayists
20th-century French male writers
21st-century French essayists
21st-century French male writers
French conspiracy theorists
French male non-fiction writers
French occult writers
Living people